Bosilovo is a village in North Macedonia. It is the seat of Bosilovo Municipality.

Demographics
According to the 2002 census, the village had a total of 1698 inhabitants. Ethnic groups in the village include:

Macedonians 1697
Others 1

References

See also
 Bosilovo Municipality
 Strumica

Villages in Bosilovo Municipality